Marion Road is a north–south arterial road through the western suburbs of Adelaide, South Australia, named after its traversal through the suburb of Marion and the local government area of City of Marion. It is designated part of route A14.

Route
Where it terminates in Bedford Park, southwest of Adelaide's centre, Marion Road feeds into the Southern Expressway near the northern starting point of that road.

At its northern end, Marion Road terminates at Henley Beach Road. Route A14 continues west on Henley Beach Road for about 250 metres. It then travels north along the entire length of Holbrooks Road. At Grange Road it take a 50-metre dog leg to the east. It then continues north along the entire length of East Avenue until it ends at Port Road.

The Glenelg tram line has a level crossing in Plympton between Anzac Highway and Cross Road. The crossing in close proximity to two major intersections sometimes causes congestion during peak times, and has been the subject of political attention to convert the intersection with the tram line into an overpass. Just south of the intersection of Oaklands and Daws Road, the Seaford railway line has an overpass over Marion Road.

Major intersections

See also

References

Roads in Adelaide